The 2009 NORCECA Beach Volleyball Circuit at Tijuana was held September 25–27, 2009 in Tijuana, Mexico. It was the fifth leg of the NORCECA Beach Volleyball Circuit 2009.

Women's competition

Men's competition
Results on September 27, 2009

References

External links
 NORCECA
 BV Info

See also
 NORCECA Beach Volleyball Circuit 2009

Tijuana
Norceca Beach Volleyball Circuit (Tijuana), 2009
NORCECA Beach Volleyball Circuit (Tijuana)
International volleyball competitions hosted by Mexico
2009 in beach volleyball